Slesarev (from слесарь meaning locksmith) is a Russian masculine surname, its feminine counterpart is Slesareva. It may refer to
Viktor Slesarev (born 1949), Russian football coach and a former player
Yuri Slesarev, Russian pianist

See also
Slesarev Svyatogor, a large experimental Russian aircraft constructed by Vasily Slesarev in 1916

Russian-language surnames